Jozef Lenárt (3 April 1923 – 11 February 2004) was a Slovak politician who was the prime minister of Czechoslovakia from 1963 to 1968.

Life and career
Born in Liptovská Porúbka, Slovakia, he graduated from a chemistry high school and worked for the Baťa company. He became a member of the Communist Party of Czechoslovakia (KSČ) and of the Communist Party of Slovakia (KSS).

Lenart was a member of the federal parliament (whose name changed several times) from 1960 to 1990, and was Speaker of the Slovak National Council from 1962 to 1963. He was also a member from 1971 to (?)1990. He served as Prime Minister of Czechoslovakia between 1963 and 1968.

Although ethnically Slovak, he became a Czech citizen after the country split in 1993.

On the basis of insufficient evidence, on 23 September 2002 Lenárt was acquitted of treason charges (along with his co-defendant Miloš Jakeš), related to his handling (or lack thereof) of the Prague Spring events in 1968. He was accused of attending a meeting at the Soviet embassy in Prague on the day after the 1968 Warsaw Pact invasion, planning to establish a new "workers and farmers'" government.

Jozef Lenárt was one of the most resilient figures in Czechoslovakia's communist hierarchy, occupying one post or another in the leadership for no less than a quarter of the century. That achievement was all the more remarkable because his career at the top straddled a succession of regimes and several abrupt changes in policy.

He died in Prague in 2004.

Major functions
1950–1953, 1957–1966, and 1970–(?)1990: Member of the KSS
1956–1958: Leading Secretary of the Regional Committee of the KSS
1958–1962: Secretary of the Central Committee of the KSS
1958–(?)1990: Member of the Central Committee of the KSČ
1962–1963: Chairman of the Slovak National Council
1963–1968: Prime Minister of Czechoslovakia
1968–1970: Secretary of the Central Committee of the KSČ
1970–1987: First Secretary of the Central Committee of the KSS
1970–(?)1990: Member of the Presidium of the KSČ
1971–(?)1990: Chairman of the Central Committee of the National Front of the Slovak Socialist Republic, and Vice-Chairman of the Central Committee of the National Front of the Czechoslovak Socialist Republic

See also
 List of prime ministers of Czechoslovakia
 List of presidents of Czechoslovakia

References

1923 births
2004 deaths
People from Liptovský Mikuláš District
Members of the Central Committee of the Communist Party of Czechoslovakia
Prime Ministers of Czechoslovakia
Members of the National Assembly of Czechoslovakia (1960–1964)
Members of the National Assembly of Czechoslovakia (1964–1968)
Members of the Chamber of the People of Czechoslovakia (1969–1971)
Members of the Chamber of the People of Czechoslovakia (1971–1976)
Members of the Chamber of the People of Czechoslovakia (1976–1981)
Members of the Chamber of the People of Czechoslovakia (1981–1986)
Members of the Chamber of the People of Czechoslovakia (1986–1990)
Communist Party of Slovakia (1939) politicians
Prime Ministers of Slovakia
Communist Party of Czechoslovakia prime ministers
People acquitted of treason